Malta participated in the Eurovision Song Contest 2004 with the song "On Again... Off Again" written by Philip Vella and Gerard James Borg. The song was performed by the duo Julie and Ludwig. The Maltese entry for the 2004 contest in Istanbul, Turkey was selected through the national final Malta Song for Europe 2004, organised by the Maltese broadcaster Public Broadcasting Services (PBS). The competition consisted of a final, held on 13 and 14 February 2004, where "On Again... Off Again" performed by Julie and Ludwig eventually emerged as the winning entry after scoring the most points from a four-member jury and a public televote.

Malta competed in the semi-final of the Eurovision Song Contest which took place on 12 May 2004. Performing during the show in position 8, "On Again... Off Again" was announced among the top 10 entries of the semi-final and therefore qualified to compete in the final on 14 May. It was later revealed that Malta placed eighth out of the 22 participating countries in the semi-final with 74 points. In the final, Malta performed in position 6 and placed twelfth out of the 24 participating countries, scoring 50 points.

Background 

Prior to the 2004 Contest, Malta had participated in the Eurovision Song Contest sixteen times since its first entry in 1971. Malta briefly competed in the Eurovision Song Contest in the 1970s before withdrawing for sixteen years. The country had, to this point, competed in every contest since returning in 1991. Malta's best placing in the contest thus far was second, which it achieved in 2002 with the song "7th Wonder" performed by Ira Losco. In the 2003 edition, Malta placed 25th with the song "To Dream Again" performed by Lynn Chircop.

For the 2004 Contest, the Maltese national broadcaster, Public Broadcasting Services (PBS), broadcast the event within Malta and organised the selection process for the nation's entry. PBS confirmed their intentions to participate at it on 10 October 2003. Malta selected their entry consistently through a national final procedure, a method that was continued for their 2005 participation.

Before Eurovision

Malta Song for Europe 2004 
Malta Song for Europe 2004 was the national final format developed by PBS to select the Maltese entry for the Eurovision Song Contest 2004. The competition was held on 13 and 14 February 2004 at the Mediterranean Conference Centre in the nation's capital city of Valletta. Both shows were hosted by Andrea Cassar and Ray Calleja and broadcast on Television Malta (TVM) as well on the website di-ve.com.

Competing entries 
Artists and composers were able to submit their entries between 10 October 2003 and 7 November 2003. Songwriters from any nationality were able to submit songs as long as the artist were Maltese or possessed Maltese citizenship. Artists were able to submit as many songs as they wished, however, they could only compete with a maximum of one in the competition. 189 entries were received by the broadcaster. On 10 December 2003, PBS announced a shortlist of 36 entries that had progressed through the selection process. The sixteen songs selected to compete in the competition were announced on 8 January 2004.

Among the selected competing artists was former Maltese Eurovision entrant Georgina who represented Malta in the 1991 contest, Debbie Scerri who represented Malta in the 1997 contest, and Fabrizio Faniello who represented Malta in the 2001 contest. Among the songwriters, Paul Abela, Gerard James Borg and Philip Vella were all past writers of Maltese Eurovision entries. Paul Giordimaina represented Malta in the 1991 edition with Georgina Abela, who co-wrote the Maltese entry in 2001. Ralph Siegel and John O'Flynn co-wrote seventeen entries for various countries.

Final 
The final took place on 13 and 14 February 2004. Sixteen entries competed and the 50/50 combination of votes of a four-member jury panel and the results of public televoting determined the winner. The interval act of the show featured performances by the 2004 Ukrainian Eurovision entrant Ruslana, and the local acts Claire Baluci, Ivan Filletti, Hooligan and Winter Moods. After the votes from the jury panel and televote were combined, "On Again... Off Again" performed by Julie and Ludwig was the winner.

Preparation 
Following Julie and Ludwig's win at the Malta Song for Europe 2004, PBS announced that "On Again... Off Again" would undergo remastering for the Eurovision Song Contest. The revamped version was produced by Ralph Siegel and the release of the song's new version and official music video was announced on 27 March 2004 and made available online. The music video for the song was filmed earlier in March at several places of Malta, including the Dwejra Window in Gozo, the San Anton Gardens in Attard and the Manoel Theatre in Valletta.

At Eurovision
The Eurovision Song Contest 2004 took place at the Abdi İpekçi Arena in Istanbul, Turkey and consisted of a semi-final for the first time on 12 May and the final of 14 May 2004. According to Eurovision rules, all nations with the exceptions of the host country, the "Big Four" (France, Germany, Spain and the United Kingdom) and the ten highest placed finishers in the 2003 contest are required to qualify from the semi-final in order to compete for the final; the top ten countries from the semi-final progress to the final. On 23 March 2004, a special allocation draw was held which determined the running order for the semi-final and Malta was set to perform in position 8, following the entry from Portugal and before the entry from Monaco. At the end of the semi-final, Malta was announced as having finished in the top 10 and consequently qualifying for the grand final. It was later revealed that Malta placed eighth in the semi-final, receiving a total of 74 points. The draw for the running order for the final was done by the presenters during the announcement of the ten qualifying countries during the semi-final and Malta was drawn to perform in position 6, following the entry from Serbia and Montenegro and before the entry from Netherlands. Malta placed twelfth in the final, scoring 50 points.

The semi-final and the final were broadcast in Malta on TVM with commentary by Eileen Montesin. The Maltese spokesperson, who announced the Maltese votes during the final, was Claire Agius.

Voting 
Below is a breakdown of points awarded to Malta and awarded by Malta in the semi-final and grand final of the contest. The nation awarded its 12 points to Greece in the semi-final and the final of the contest.

Points awarded to Malta

Points awarded by Malta

References

2004
Countries in the Eurovision Song Contest 2004
Eurovision